, also known as Love is Shared Like Sweets, is a 1955 Japanese drama film directed by Shirō Toyoda, starring Hisaya Morishige and Chikage Awashima. It is an adaptation of the 1940 novel of the same name by Sakunosuke Oda.

Marital Relations tells the story of a couple, a disinherited son of a shopkeeper and his geisha mistress, in Osaka in the early Shōwa era.

Cast
 Hisaya Morishige
 Chikage Awashima
 Yoko Tsukasa
 Chieko Naniwa
 Haruo Tanaka

Awards
Marital Relations received the Blue Ribbon Awards for Best Director, Best Actor (Morishige) and Best Actress (Awashima), and the Mainichi Film Concours for Best Actor and Best Screenplay (Yasumi Toshio). It ranked second (after Mikio Naruse's Floating Clouds) on the list of the year's ten best films of Kinema Junpō.

References

External links
 
 

Japanese black-and-white films
1955 films
1955 drama films
Films based on Japanese novels
Films directed by Shirō Toyoda
Japanese drama films
1950s Japanese films
1950s Japanese-language films